Transient receptor potential canonical 1 (TRPC1) is a protein that in humans is encoded by the TRPC1 gene.

Function 

TRPC1 is an ion channel located on the plasma membrane of numerous human and animal cell types.

It is a nonspecific cation channel, which means that both sodium and calcium ions can pass through it. TRPC1 is thought to mediate calcium entry in response to depletion of endoplasmic calcium stores or activation of receptors coupled to the phospholipase C system. In HEK293 cells the unitary current-voltage relationship of endogenous TRPC1 channels is almost linear, with a slope conductance of about 17 pS. The extrapolated reversal potential of TRPC1 channels is +30 mV. 
The TRPC1 protein is widely expressed throughout the mammalian brain and has a similar corticolimbic expression pattern as TRPC4 and TRPC5.
 The highest density of TRPC1 protein is found in the lateral septum, an area with dense TRPC4 expression, and hippocampus and prefrontal cortex, areas with dense TRPC5 expression.

History 

TRPC1 was the first mammalian Transient Receptor Potential channel to be identified. In 1995 it was cloned when the research groups headed by Craig Montell and Lutz Birnbaumer were searching for proteins similar to the TRP channel in Drosophila. Together with TRPC3 they became the founding members of the TRPC ion channel family.

Interactions 

TRPC1 has been shown to interact with:
 HOMER3, 
 Polycystic kidney disease 2, 
 RHOA 
 TRPC3, 
 TRPC4, and
 TRPC5.

See also 
 TRPC

References

Further reading

External links 
 
 

Ion channels